Women's 80 metres hurdles world record progression refers to the 80 metres hurdles, which was run by women until 1972 in international competitions.

From the 1972 Summer Olympics, the event has been permanently replaced by the 100 metre hurdles.

Progression

See also
 80 m hurdles medalists at Olympic Games

References

External links
 Athletics Women's 80 metres Hurdles Medalists

80 h, women
World record